Foundations of Cyclopean Perception is a book by Bela Julesz, published in 1971.

The Millennium Project ranked it at #57 on a list of the 100 most influential books in cognitive science in the 20th century.

References 

1971 non-fiction books
Psychology books